The Smiling Girl, thought to be by Johannes Vermeer, was donated by collector Andrew W. Mellon in 1937 to the National Gallery of Art in Washington, D.C. Now widely considered to be a fake, the painting was claimed by the Vermeer expert Arthur K. Wheelock Jr. in a 1995 study to be by a 20th-century artist and forger, Theo van Wijngaarden, a friend of Han van Meegeren.

References

Painting forgeries
Collections of the National Gallery of Art